Devah Iwalani Pager (March 1, 1972 – November 2, 2018) was an American sociologist best known for her research on racial discrimination in employment and the American criminal justice system. At the time of her death, she was Professor of Sociology and Public Policy at Harvard University. She was a class of 2011 William T. Grant Scholar.

Biography 
Devah grew up in Hawaii. She attended Punahou.

Pager earned her doctorate at the University of Wisconsin–Madison in 2002. Prior to that she received master's degrees from Stanford University and the University of Cape Town in South Africa, and a B.A. in psychology from University of California, Los Angeles in 1993.  She was a 1989 graduate of Punahou School.

As part of her doctoral dissertation research Pager conducted an experiment in which she enlisted young men to pose as job applicants with similar characteristics. She found that a black applicant received a callback or job offer half as often as an equally qualified white applicant. A black applicant with a clean record got a callback or job offer about as often as a white applicant with a felony conviction. She later replicated the experiment in 2009 with Bruce Western and Naomi Sugle and found that black applicants without criminal records received fewer callbacks than white applicants with criminal records. The dissertation was awarded the "Best Dissertation Prize" by the American Sociological Association and was later published as a series of articles and a book, Marked: Race, Crime, and Finding Work in an Era of Mass Incarceration (University of Chicago Press, 2007).

Pager's work has been widely featured in the media, including The New York Times, The Wall Street Journal, the Chicago Tribune, and in CNN's documentary Black in America. Pager's work was frequently cited by supporters of Ban The Box, a movement which aims to ban employers from asking potential employees if they have a criminal record on their application.

Pager died of pancreatic cancer on November 2, 2018 at the age of 46.

Selected bibliography

References 

1972 births
2018 deaths
Writers from Honolulu
21st-century American women writers
Punahou School alumni
University of California, Los Angeles alumni
University of Wisconsin–Madison College of Letters and Science alumni
Harvard University faculty
American women sociologists
American sociologists
Deaths from cancer in Massachusetts
Deaths from pancreatic cancer